Valeri Viktorovich Leonov (born 17 September 1980) is a former Russian professional football player.

Club career
He made his debut in the Russian Premier League in 2001 for FC Torpedo-ZIL Moscow.

References

External links
Official site

1980 births
Footballers from Moscow
Living people
Russian footballers
FC Moscow players
FC Tom Tomsk players
FC Akhmat Grozny players
FC Dynamo Barnaul players
Russian expatriate footballers
Expatriate footballers in Latvia
FC Sibir Novosibirsk players
Russian Premier League players
Latvian Higher League players
Russian expatriate sportspeople in Latvia
Association football midfielders
FC Torpedo Vladimir players